The Roman Catholic Diocese of Porto Novo is a diocese located in the city of Porto Novo in the Ecclesiastical province of Cotonou in Benin.

History
 5 April 1954: Established as Apostolic Vicariate of Porto Novo from Apostolic Vicariate of Ouidah
 14 September 1955: Promoted as Diocese of Porto Novo

Special churches
The Cathedral of the diocese is Cathédrale Notre Dame de l’Immaculée Conception in Porto Novo.

Leadership
 Bishops of Porto Novo (Roman rite), in reverse chronological order
 Bishop Aristide Gonsallo: 24 October 2015 - Present
Bishop René-Marie Ehuzu, C.I.M.: 3 January 2007  – 17 October 2012
 Bishop Marcel Honorat Léon Agboton: 29 January 2000  – 5 March 2005, appointed Archbishop of Cotonou
 Bishop Vincent Mensah: 21 September 1970  – 29 January 2000
 Bishop Noël Boucheix, S.M.A.: 6 July 1958  – 1 January 1969

See also
 Roman Catholicism in Benin

References

External links
 GCatholic.org 

Porto-Novo
Porto Novo
Christian organizations established in 1954
Roman Catholic dioceses and prelatures established in the 20th century
Porto Novo, Roman Catholic Diocese of